The Lancer Assault Rifle, also known as simply the Lancer, is a fictional class of firearm weapons featured in the Gears of War media franchise. Variants of the Lancer appear in the video game series as well as in related media, beginning with Gears of War. The most well known model is the Mark (MK) 2 Lancer Assault Rifle, a mid-range assault rifle with a fully operational chainsaw for a bayonet, and is usually available as one of the starting weapons used by the protagonists of the series.

The Lancer has been very well received since the inception of the Gears of War franchise and has been subject to numerous licensed merchandise. Video game journalists have called the Lancer one of the most iconic weapons in video games.

Characteristics 
Within the series, the Lancer series of assault rifles are standard issue weapons for Coalition of Ordered Governments ("COG") soldiers. The Mark 1, also known as the Retro Lancer, has a traditional blade-type bayonet. The Mark 2 Lancer Assault Rifle, the successor of the older Mark 1 model, is originally developed by Adam Fenix, the father of series protagonist Marcus Fenix. Its chainsaw bayonet when accelerated will quickly kill its victim; this is usually represented by a short animation where the target is executed by dismemberment. In Gears of War 4, Marcus Fenix wields a customized Mark 2 Lancer which features several design changes. His "Custom Lancer" serves as the in-universe basis for the Mark 3 introduced in Gears 5, which comes in two variants: the standard Mark 3 with a chainsaw bayonet, and the Lancer GL which is capable of firing laser-guided clusters of grenades with its under-barrel mortar in lieu of a chainsaw bayonet.

The Lancer has had its ammo capacity, magazine size, and firepower constantly downgraded and upgraded throughout the series due to gameplay balance concerns.

Development 
According to Cliff Bleszinski, Epic Games' original design director, the development team decided early in production for the first Gears of War that the default gun should be "very distinctive, multifunctional and, most importantly, fun to use", with inspiration drawn from The Evil Dead, Doom, and The Texas Chainsaw Massacre. He emphasized the developers' belief in the importance of a unique silhouette for the Lancer, so that it would be easily identifiable and instantly associated with the series' gun-based combat. He explained that within the series' fiction, it is "critical to develop a firearm that is effective in battling the Locust – one that is devastating from both a strategic and physiological standpoint". Senior concept artist at Epic Games James Hawkins developed several design iterations for the game's melee combat, which began as a circular buzzsaw before evolving into the chainsaw bayonet. Bleszinski recalled that the bayonet design was very well received by the rest of the team once it was unveiled, noting that "the chainsawing experience became increasingly rewarding" as the team refined the Lancer's feel and effect. On the Lancer's ability to perform gruesome executions, Bleszinski remarked that "intimate violence is a pillar of Gears’ gameplay". 

Following the critical and commercial success of the first two Gears of War games, writer Joshua Ortega indicated at a New York Comic Con panel in early 2009 that the Gears of War franchise was intended to be a long-term plan that would go on for at least a decade, and called the Lancer "the new lightsaber". 

From Gears of War 4 onwards, the Lancer has a flashlight attachment, which is intended to accentuate the survival horror aspect of the game.

Promotion and merchandise
The Lancer is a popular subject for Gears of War merchandise, with replica models often offered as standalone purchases or in a retail bundle to promote the release of video game instalments. One of the earliest examples was a life-sized Lancer replica offered by Amazon.com as part of a special Gears of War 2 retail edition bundle for pre-orders of Gears of War II prior to its launch date on November 7, 2008. The replica Lancer is 36 inches long by 10-inches tall, and weighs 13 pounds; its trigger produces chain-saw sounds and a rumble effect. Other examples include 1:1 scale replicas of Lancers by TriForce Sales made from high density foam, fiberglass and polyurethane composites; a yellow "Car No. 13" Lancer with checkered taxi cab accents; and scale replicas of Marcus Fenix's Customized Lancer, including a limited edition gold version, by video game accessory makers PDP. 

In 2013, Epic Games auctioned off three signed replica Lancers to help fund the medical expenses of a former Insomniac Games staff member following a hit-and-run car accident.

The Lancer makes a crossover appearance in the 2020 video game Wasteland 3 as an equippable weapon.

Cultural impact

Fandom
The Gears of Wars series' popularity have inspired homemade toy versions of the Lancer using components like Lego blocks, or a Nerf Longshot paired with a toy chainsaw,

Critical reception

The Lancer was featured in an article published in the July 2008 edition of Electronic Gaming Monthly that discusses its practicality and historical precedents. A consultant for the Call of Duty series, Hank Keirsey, criticized the weapon and pointed out that in real life, "chainsaws are heavy." He noted that the closest historical precedents are "medieval bludgeoning weapons".

IGN ranked the Mark 2 Lancer Assault Rifle 10th place on its list of Top 100 Video Game Weapons, with praise for the chainsaw bayonet and automatic rifle combination as well as the execution mechanic. OXM staff included the Mark 2 Lancer in its list of "the 15 greatest guns in Xbox history" and called it their ideal "dystopian future-gun". 
Nicholas Bashore from Inverse ranked the Lancer as the best weapon in the series, and noted its iconic status in the franchise as well as the entire video game industry.

For Maddy Myers from Kotaku, the chainsaw variant of the Lancer is indispensable for the Gears of Wars series and the tendency for Gears of War 4 to reduce the usage of the Lancer throughout its single player campaign reduces her enjoyment of the game. Edge Magazine staff said the "violent, messy, grim, clunky and somewhat absurd" Lancer "epitomises and fortifies the games’ style, tone and themes", and emphasized that in the video game medium "where guns are more common than plotlines, the Lancer does the seemingly impossible: it stands out". Luke McKinney from Gamesradar described the "sheer release of joy, the yelling, the noise and clenching muscles and the endorphin release" he experienced when he pulled off a Lancer execution for the first time, noting that it is so effective "even the Locust use it, dropping the Hammerburst like the ridiculous non-chainsaw-inclusive piece of garbage it is". 

Edwin Evans-Thirlwell from Eurogamer described the Lancer as "barbaric yet precise, a clownish torture device that doubles as an unpretentious assault rifle with a generous magazine". Evans-Thirlwell recognized the Lancer's enduring popularity, calling it "one of the most recognizable video game weapons ever designed - an improbable hybrid worthy of Jekyll and Hyde", which he considers to be a summation of the series' "oddly persuasive mixture of styles and tones". However, he noted that while the Lancer might be the signature weapon of the series and its "rockstar frontman", he expressed a preference for the Gnasher Shotgun's superior firepower. Michael Goroff from EGM is less enthusiastic about the Lancer compared to other reviewers. He described the Gears of War series as one that "goofily fetishizes its weaponry—the essence of the game’s creativity lives within its guns". Goroff remarked that the series' guns are close enough to reality that players would recognize and embrace them as weapons, but are in truth too wacky and ridiculous to be taken seriously.

External links

References 

Gears of War
Fictional elements introduced in 2006
Fictional firearms
Science fiction weapons
Video game objects